Fritz Kübert (8 December 1939 – 1 September 1997) was a German footballer who played as a defender for Eintracht Frankfurt.

Career
Kübert joined Eintracht Frankfurt in 1952. He made his first and only appearance for the club in the Bundesliga on 19 September 1964 against Karlsruher SC. The home match finished as a 0–7 loss for Frankfurt.

Personal life
Kübert was the son of Fritz Kübert I, former player, committee member, youth coach and honorary member of Eintracht Frankfurt. Kübert died on 1 September 1997 at the age of 57.

References

General references

External links
 Fritz Kübert at Eintracht-Archiv.de
 
 
 

1939 births
1997 deaths
German footballers
Association football defenders
Eintracht Frankfurt players
Bundesliga players